Revolutionary War(s) may refer to:

 American Revolutionary War (1775–1783), the armed conflict between Great Britain and 13 of its North American colonies, which had declared themselves the independent United States of America
 French Revolutionary Wars, a series of military conflicts (1792–1802) resulting from the French Revolution
 Peninsular War, a Spanish revolutionary war
 Texas Revolution
 Philippine Revolution
 Russian Civil War, a war between the Soviet Red Army and the White movement and its allies
 Irish War of Independence, a guerrilla war between the Irish Republican Army and British security forces
 People's war, a military-political strategy developed by Mao Zedong
 Indonesian National Revolution
 Cuban Revolution, an armed revolt conducted by Fidel Castro's 26th of July Movement against President Fulgencio Batista

Other types of conflicts that can be called "revolutionary wars" include:
 Liberation war, a conflict primarily intended to bring freedom or independence to a nation or group
 War of independence, a conflict occurring over a territory that has declared independence
 War of national liberation, conflicts fought by nationalities to gain independence
 Rebellion, a refusal of obedience or order

See also
List of revolutions and rebellions
List of wars of independence
Restoration War (disambiguation)
Revolution (disambiguation)
Revolutions (disambiguation)
War (disambiguation)